The Honourable Anna Bridget Plowden,  (18 June 1938 – 21 August 1997) was a British archaeological conservator and restorer. She has been described as the first scientifically trained conservator to work in the private sector, rather than in a museum or university. She worked as a freelance conservator, having set up her own business, Anna Plowden Ltd, in 1968. In order to take on larger projects, her business merged with Peter Smith (R and R) Ltd in 1985; Plowden and Smith Ltd remains "one of the largest and most successful businesses in the conservation private sector".

Honours
In 1970, Plowden was elected a Fellow of the International Institute for Conservation (FIIC). In the 1997 New Year Honours, she was appointed a Commander of the Order of the British Empire (CBE) "for conservation services to museums".

References

1938 births
1997 deaths
Conservator-restorers
Commanders of the Order of the British Empire
British women in business
Daughters of life peers
20th-century British businesspeople